Hong Kong Squash (HKS) is the National Organisation for Squash in Hong Kong.

Mission Statement :
 To ensure that squash remains a strong, viable and growing Hong Kong sport and that Hong Kong aspires to be the leaders of Squash in Asia.

Objectives :
To develop the game of squash in Hong Kong.
To safeguard the game of squash and to maintain the rules and regulations of HK Squash in Hong Kong.
To represent Hong Kong's official membership of the World Squash Federation, Asian Squash Federation and Sports Federation and Olympic Committee.
To arrange, regulate and manage international and local matches, championships and competitions.
Generally to do all such other acts and things as are incidental or conducive to the attainment of all or any of the above objects.

External links
Official site

See also
 Hong Kong men's national squash team
 Hong Kong women's national squash team
 Hong Kong Junior Open

Squash
Squash in Hong Kong
National members of the World Squash Federation